Edwin Atlee Barber (August 13, 1851 – December 12, 1916) was an American archaeologist and author.

Biography
Edwin Atlee Barber was born in Baltimore, Maryland to William Edwin Barber and Anne Eliza Townsend. He entered Lafayette College in 1869 but left before graduating to assume a position as an assistant naturalist for the Hayden Survey.  He developed an interest in decorated pottery and rapidly became an authority in Pueblo ceramic art. He contributed several articles to the American Naturalist about his work with the Hayden Survey. He returned to Lafayette College and graduated in 1877. In 1881, Barber was elected as a member to the American Philosophical Society.

Edwin received a graduate degree from Lafayette College in 1893 and began working as curator of ceramics at the Pennsylvania Museum and School of Industrial Art becoming the director in 1907.

Marriage and children
On February 5, 1880 he married Nellie Louise Parker and in 1883 she gave birth to their only child Louise Atlee Barber.

Published works
 Language and Utensils of the Modern Utes. 1876
 The Ancient Pottery of Colorado, Utah, Arizona and New Mexico. 1876
 Bead Ornaments Employed by the Ancient Tribes of Utah and Arizona.  1876
 Comparative Vocabulary of Utah Dialects. 1877
 Moqui Food-Preparations.  1878
 The Ancient Pueblos; or, The Ruins of the Valley of the Rio San Juan.  1878
 The Pottery and Porcelain of the United States 1893
 Tulip Ware of the Pennsylvania-German Potters An Historical Sketch of the Art of Slip-Decoration in the United States. 1903
 Marks of American Potters. 1904
 Tin Enamelled Pottery. 1907
 The Maiolica of Mexico.1908

See also
List of Directors of the Philadelphia Museum of Art

References 

Hough, Walter. "Barber, Edwin Atlee." Dictionary of American Biography. Vol. 1, Charles Scribner's Sons. 1928.
Men and Women of America; A Biographical Dictionary of Contemporaries. (p. 90) New York City: L.R. Hamersly & Company, 1910. googlebooks Retrieved January 10, 2009

External links
 
 

1851 births
1916 deaths
American archaeologists
American curators
Lafayette College alumni
Directors of the Philadelphia Museum of Art